The 2011 FC Shakhter Karagandy season was the clubs twentieth successive season in the Kazakhstan Premier League, the highest tier of association football in Kazakhstan.

Squad

Transfers

Winter

In:

Out:

Summer

In:

Out:

Competitions

Kazakhstan Premier League

First round

Results

League table

Championship Round

Results

Table

Kazakhstan Cup

UEFA Europa League

Qualifying rounds

Squad statistics

Appearances and goals

|-
|colspan="14"|Players away from Shakhter Karagandy on loan:
|-
|colspan="14"|Players who appeared for Shakhter Karagandy that left during the season:

|}

Goal scorers

Disciplinary record

References

FC Shakhter Karagandy seasons
Shakhter Karagandy
Shakhter Karagandy
Shakhter Karagandy